No. 19 Squadron was a squadron of the Royal New Zealand Air Force. Formed on 10 December 1941 at RNZAF Station Ohakea from members of No. 3 Squadron equipped with P-40 Kittyhawk and later with the Chance-Vought F4U-1 Corsair fighter bombers.

History
The squadron was formed in November 1943 equipped with the P-40 Kittyhawk, and was deployed to Guadalcanal from February 1944. In March that year, it relieved No. 18 Squadron RNZAF on Bougainville, flying patrol and ground attack missions against Japanese forces. It was regularly rotated between Guadalcanal and operations from Bougainville until November when it moved to Emirau Island in the Bismarck Archipeligo, where it provided day fighter defence until January 1945.

The squadron's forward operational base continued to move forward as Allied forces advanced, with the squadron moving to Los Negros Island in the Admiralty Islands in March 1945 and Jacquinot Bay in New Britain in July, from where it flew missions against the Japanese bases at Rabaul. It disbanded in October 1945.

Commanding officers
Squadron Leader H. R. Wigley
Squadron Leader M. T. Vanderpump
Squadron Leader J. R. C. Kilian
Squadron Leader H. A. Eaton

References

19
Military units and formations established in 1941
Military units and formations disestablished in 1945
Squadrons of the RNZAF in World War II